John Pasford or Pafford (fl. 1371–1394) of Devon, was an English politician.

He was a Member (MP) of the Parliament of England for Dartmouth in 1371 and for Totnes in 1386 and 1394.

References

Year of birth missing
Year of death missing
English MPs 1371
Members of the Parliament of England (pre-1707) for Totnes
English MPs 1386
English MPs 1394
Members of the Parliament of England for Dartmouth